Villainous may refer to:

Villainous (TV series), a Mexican animated series
Villainous, a card game by Ravensburger, based on Disney villains

See also 

 Villain (disambiguation)